Võru FC Helios is an Estonian football club based in Võru. The club was founded in 2010. The team currently plays in the II liiga, the fourth highest level of Estonian football.

The team played IV liiga in 2014–2016. In the end of year 2016, Võru JK merged with the team and Helios got their place in II liiga. They ended 2017 with 3rd place and were promoted to Esiliiga B, where Helios played until 2020.

Players

Current squad
''As of 7 April 2022.

Statistics

League and Cup

References

External links
  
 Team info at Estonian Football Association

Football clubs in Estonia
Association football clubs established in 2010
Sport in Võru
2010 establishments in Estonia